Pavlo Kutas (born 3 September 1982) is a Ukrainian footballer of Hungarian ethnicity who played as a defender for FC Chornomorets Odesa. Kutas moved to Chornomorets from FC Obolon Kyiv on 5 July 2011.

External links

Russian First Division Squads 2008 at RSSSF.com

1982 births
Living people
Ukrainian footballers
Association football defenders
FC Hoverla Uzhhorod players
FC Obolon-Brovar Kyiv players
FC Dynamo Bryansk players
FC Chornomorets Odesa players
Ukrainian people of Hungarian descent
Ukrainian expatriate footballers
Expatriate footballers in Russia
FC SKA-Khabarovsk players
Ukrainian Premier League players
Ukraine youth international footballers